The Klågerup riots (Swedish: Klågerupskravallerna) is the name for a series of Swedish rebellions which took place in Scania in Sweden in the summer of 1811.

That year a series of rebellions took place in Scania, caused by discontent about, among other things, the draft for military service. This led to demonstrations by civilian armies of peasantry, who demanded negotiations with the authorities. The rebels were displeased with both the army, which wanted to enforce conscription, and the Swedish priests who refused to stand up for the people.

The name Klågerup riots are given to the events from the end of the affair: the last forces of the rebel army, gathered at Klågerup, refused to surrender and was attacked by the military on 15.June 1811, leading to some 40 dead from gunshots at once (23 of them died in Klågerup), and several more who later died from infected wounds.

Hundreds were brought in chains to Malmöhus Castle, which partly served as a prison. More died during 5-6 months of custody. Finally, a man, who the Swedish authorities believed to be some kind of rebel leader, was publicly executed at Stortorget square in Malmö.

See also
 Maria Nilsdotter i Ölmeskog
 Anglo-Swedish War

References

Sources 
 Birger Persson: Bondeupproret i Skåne: Ett 150-årsminne. Särtryck ur Ystads Allehanda, 20/5, 27/5, 3/6 1961.
 Gösta Johannesson: Skånes historia. Signum 1977.
 K Arne Blom och Jan Moen: Slagfält i Skåneland. Liber 1986.
 Gert-Ove Pettersson & Sven Rosborn m.fl.: 1811. Bondeupproret i Skåne. Malmö 1991. 
 Mats Olsson, Sten Skansjö och Kerstin Sundberg: Gods och bönder från högmedeltid till nutid: kontinuitet genom omvandling på Vittskövle och andra skånska gods. Nordic Academic Press 2006, .
 Alf Åberg: Skånes historia i fickformat. Natur & Kultur 1997, .

Conflicts in 1811
1811 in Sweden
Peasant revolts
Rebellions in Sweden
19th-century rebellions